Teignmouth is a town in Devon, England.

Teignmouth may also refer to:
 Teignmouth (album), a 1991 electronic music album
 Teignmouth railway station, a station in the town of Teignmouth
 Teignmouth R.F.C., a rugby football club
 Baron Teignmouth, a title in the Peerage of Ireland
 Teignmouth, a given name:
 Teignmouth Melvill (1842–1879), English army officer
 Teignmouth Philip Melvill (1877–1951), English polo player

See also 
 Tinmouth (disambiguation)